Strange Celestial Road is an album by jazz composer, bandleader and keyboardist Sun Ra and his Arkestra recorded in New York in 1979 and originally released on the Rounder label.

Reception
The Allmusic review by Sean Westergaard awarded the album 4 stars stating "This is an overlooked album in an unwieldy discography, but it's a real gem".

Track listing
All compositions by Sun Ra
 "Celestial Road" - 7:02   
 "Say" - 12:05   
 "I'll Wait for You" - 16:00

Personnel
Sun Ra - electric piano, organ, synthesizer 
Michael Ray, Curt Pulliam, Walter Miller - trumpet
Craig Harris, Tony Bethel - trombone
Vincent Chancey - French horn
Marshall Allen - alto saxophone, flute
John Gilmore - tenor saxophone, percussion
James Jacson - flute, bassoon, percussion
Eloe Omoe - bass clarinet, flute
Danny Ray Thompson - baritone saxophone, flute
Kenny Williams - tenor saxophone, baritone saxophone, flute
Knoel Scott - alto saxophone, baritone saxophone
Hutch Jones - alto saxophone, tenor saxophone
Sylvester Baton - reeds
Skeeter McFarland, Taylor Richardson - electric guitar
Steve Clark - electric bass
Richard Williams - bass
Harry Wilson, Damon Choice - vibraphone
Luqman Ali, Reg McDonald - drums
Atakatune - percussion
June Tyson, Rhoda Blount - vocals

References 

Sun Ra albums
Rounder Records albums
1980 albums